This is a list of publicly accessible, motorable passes in the Northern Cape province, South Africa.
See Mountain Passes of South Africa

Northern Cape
Mountain passes
Mountain passes of Northern Cape
Mountain passes of Northern Cape